Previte is a surname. Notable people with the surname include:

 Bobby Previte (born 1951), American drummer, composer, and bandleader
 Franke Previte (born 1946), American singer, songwriter, and composer
 Mary Previte (1932–2019), American politician
 Ron Previte (1943–2017), American mobster